The 2012 EHF European Men's Handball Championship was the tenth edition of the men's continental handball tournament, which was held in Serbia between 15 and 29 January 2012. Sixteen teams qualified for the event, including host nation Serbia, defending champion France and fourteen national teams through the qualifying tournament. The teams were split into four groups of 4, with the top 3 teams of each group advancing to the main round, carrying the points won against other qualified opponents. Going to the main round with no points, Denmark ended up winning the championship after defeating Serbia in the final with a scoreline of 21–19.

The bronze medal was claimed by Croatia, who defeated Spain 31–27 to win their second bronze and fourth European medal overall. In the placement match for the 5th position Macedonia proved to be too strong for Slovenia and won the match by 28–27. Macedonian right back Kiril Lazarov led his team with 8 goals to success and took the top scorers' award with a European Championship record of 61 goals. Over 300,000 spectators were present in 47 matches during the tournament, which was also a new championship record.

By winning the European title, Denmark directly qualified for the 2012 Summer Olympics, while Serbia and Macedonia secured a spot in the Olympic Qualification Tournament. Thanks to the Danish triumph, Poland also made it to the qualifiers as the eighth ranked team of the 2011 World Championship.

Denmark, Serbia and Croatia as three best-ranked teams qualified directly for 2013 World Men's Handball Championship.

The championship was somewhat overshadowed by incidents that occurred during the final week of the event. On 26–27 January, in violent attacks, cars were damaged or set on fire, and several Croatian supporters were injured. In the semifinal match between Serbia and Croatia, Žarko Šešum, the back player of the Serbian team had his eye severely injured after a bottle intended for Croatian player Ivano Balić and coach Slavko Goluža was thrown at him.

Background
The EHF decided that Serbia would host the tournament in the cities of Belgrade, Niš, Novi Sad and Vršac. Germany and France were the other applicants for the championship.

Qualification

The 2012 Championship was the second for which the new qualification system was used.

Qualified teams

1 Bold indicates champion for that year

Squads

Venues

Source: Serbian Handball Federation: Euro 2010

Audience

Referees
On 12 September 2011, 12 couples were announced in Vienna.

List of broadcasters

Seeding
The draw was held on 15 June 2011 in Belgrade at 12:00 local time. The seeding was announced on 13 June 2011.

Group stage
The match schedule was released and confirmed on 18 April 2011. Four teams were selected to play in the four venue cities, Serbia in Belgrade, Macedonia at Niš, Hungary at Novi Sad and Croatia in Vršac. The playing schedule was announced on 1 July.

All times are UTC+1.

Group A
Venue: Pionir Hall, Belgrade

Group B
Venue: Čair Sports Center, Niš

Group C
Venue: Spens Sports Center, Novi Sad

Group D
Venue: Millennium Centar, Vršac

Main round
Group stage results between teams that qualified for the main round were carried over.

Group I
Venue: Belgrade Arena, Belgrade

Result

Initial standing and matches

(A) and (B) indicates from which group the teams came; in the main round they were playing only against teams from the other group. By three victories and the misfortune of among others Germany, Denmark qualified for the semifinals together with the host, Serbia. Notable results were Denmark's last second win against Macedonia and Poland's turnaround of first-half 9-20 result to win second half by the same numbers to equalize against Sweden.

Group II
Venue: Spens Sports Center, Novi Sad

Result

Initial standing and matches

(C) and (D) above indicates from which group the teams came, in the main round they are only playing against teams from the other group.

Knockout stage
Venue: Belgrade Arena, Belgrade

Bracket

Semifinals

Fifth place game

Bronze medal game

Final

The final was played at the Belgrade Arena between the host-nation Serbia and Denmark, and was seen by 19,800 spectators. The teams played a match against each other in the group stage of the tournament, when Serbia defeated Denmark 24–22. Serbia's coach Veselin Vuković could not rely on Žarko Šešum, whose left eye was injured after he was hit with a bottle on the halftime break of the semi-final match against Croatia.

The match started with tough play by both teams and low scoring. Denmark claimed the lead in the early phase of the match and controlled the period. Serbia's attacks were ineffective, and goalkeeper Darko Stanić made several saves. The Danes made fewer mistakes in the attacks and Anders Eggert scored important goals in the counter-attacks. Denmark led at halftime 9–7.

Early in the second half Denmark took an 11–7 lead, but then the Serbian players halted the opponent's run with a better play in defence, except for Mikkel Hansen who scored with his powerful shots in the critical moments of the game. The Danes were having the lead all the time with a margin of 1–4 goals and thanks to the saves of their goalkeeper Niklas Landin Jacobsen prevented the Serbians to level the result. The last minutes of the game were played with many mistakes on both sides, but Hansen scored the decisive goal for peerless lead 21–18 with 20 seconds to go. Serbia scored until the end making it 21–19 in favor of Denmark at the end. This was the second title for Denmark after they have previously won the European Championship in 2008.

Ranking and statistics

Final ranking
The final ranking for places 7 to 16 was determined by the team's group stage record. In case the ranking would have been relevant for Olympic qualification, there would have been a placement match for 7th and 9th place.

All Star Team
Goalkeeper: 
Left Wing: 
Left Back: 
Centre Back: 
Pivot: 
Right Back: 
Right Wing:

Other awards
Top Scorer : 
Best Defence Player : 
Most Valuable Player: 
Source: ehf-euro.com, 29.01.2012

Top goalscorers

Source: EHF

Controversies

Riots

On 24 January 2012, after the match between Croatia and France, Serbian hooligans attacked Croatian fans in several locations in Vojvodina, northern Serbia. In Novi Sad, Croatian supporters were heading home after the game, when they ran into a road block and some 50 masked men assaulted them with stones, bricks and axes, smashing windscreens. The attack left several supporters injured and one of them hospitalized.

A day later the unrest continued and many cars were damaged, torched, or burnt out throughout Novi Sad. The Croatian Foreign Ministry officially complained to Serbian Ambassador Stanimir Vukicevic over the attacks; Vukicevic expressed regret and stated that the Serbian police was already taking the necessary steps. Thirteen people were arrested in connection with the incident, including Ivan Ključovski and Jovan Bajić, leaders of a fan group from Novi Sad, and a member of the Obraz right-wing organization. After questioning, all of them remained in custody for a month.

Serbia–Croatia semifinal
Serbia and Croatia met in the semi-final of the tournament, which caused further concern on both sides. About 5,000 policemen were deployed to ensure the security of the fans, while in Croatia some tourist agencies cancelled trips for the match and the Croatian Handball Federation (Hrvatski rukometni savez, HRS) also recommended not to go to Serbia as the supporters' safety might not be guaranteed. Spokesman Zlatko Skrinjar also added that the HRS had planned to organize trips for the event, however, they changed their mind due to the incidents in the preceding days. On the Croatian-Serbian border, joint checkpoints were set up to prevent hooligans and other groups who have no ticket for the match to enter Serbia, and to escort the fans with tickets from the border to Belgrade.

The police reported that there were no incidents during the match, which was eventually won by the Serbians 26–22, however, a bottle actually meant for Croatian playmaker Ivano Balić and coach Slavko Goluža hit Serbian back player Žarko Šešum, severely injuring his eye. Šešum's eye suffered significant bleeding. After the trauma he had only minimal vision on the affected eye, but the risk of permanent sight loss was reportedly averted. Morten Stig Christensen, Secretary of the Danish Handball Federation, Serbia's opponent in the final said that he was "severely shocked" by the incident and so were the people from the European Handball Federation with whom he spoke. Christensen also added that he was shocked that although there were more than five thousand security personnel at the stadium, the hooligans still managed to sneak in Roman candles and laser lights.

See also
European Handball Federation

References

External links
Official website

 
2012
European Men's Handball Championship
Sports competitions in Novi Sad
Sport in Vršac
2012 in Serbian sport
Sports riots
Articles containing video clips
International handball competitions hosted by Serbia
January 2012 sports events in Europe
21st century in Novi Sad